Norodom Kanviman Norleak Tevi (1876–1912) was a Cambodian princess, and the spouse of Sisowath Monivong, whom she married in 1894, and had seven children. She died in 1912, 15 years before Sisowath Monivong was crowned king.

References

1876 births
1912 deaths
House of Norodom
House of Sisowath

Cambodian princesses